Wilbert Montgomery (born September 16, 1954) is an American former professional football player who was a running back in the National Football League (NFL) for nine years with the Philadelphia Eagles and Detroit Lions.  He was also the running backs and tight ends coach for St. Louis Rams (1997–2005), the running backs coach for the Lions (2006–2007), the running backs coach for the Baltimore Ravens (2008–2013), and the running backs coach for the Cleveland Browns (2014–2015).

Playing career

College
An outstanding athlete at Abilene Christian University, Montgomery was a four-year starter at running back and set the all-time National Association of Intercollegiate Athletics record for touchdowns with 76.  He broke the record for touchdowns by a freshman with 37, and helped lead the Wildcats to the NAIA Division I National Championship in 1973. That same year, he was featured in "Faces in the Crowd" in the November 12 issue of Sports Illustrated.

NFL
Montgomery was drafted by the Philadelphia Eagles in the sixth round of the 1977 NFL Draft.  Wearing number 31, Montgomery played eight seasons with Philadelphia, shattering most Eagles' rushing records and leading the club in rushing six times.  He concluded his NFL career with the Detroit Lions in 1985, and still holds or previously held seven Philadelphia rushing records, including: career attempts (1,465), rushing yards (6,538, broken by LeSean McCoy in 2014), attempts in a season (338 in 1979), rushing yards in a season (1,512 in 1979, since broken by LeSean McCoy in 2013), career 100-yard rushing games (26), 100-yard rushing games in a season (8 in 1981), and touchdowns in a game (4).  In the 1980 NFC championship game, Montgomery rushed for a franchise postseason record 194 yards, leading the team to Super Bowl XV, the first Super Bowl in team history.  In 1979, Montgomery led the NFL with 2,012 all-purpose yards (rushing, receiving, returns).  Over his NFL career, he accumulated 6,789 yards rushing, 2,502 receiving, 814 kickoff return yards, 57 touchdowns (45 rushing, 12 receiving, 1 kickoff return), and two Pro Bowl invitations (1978–79).

Coaching career

NFL
Montgomery joined the St. Louis Rams' coaching staff as running backs coach in 1997, coaching Pro Bowl running backs Marshall Faulk and Steven Jackson. Under Montgomery's leadership, Faulk moved into 12th place on the NFL's rushing yardage list, and Jackson finished third in the NFL among rookie running backs. He won his first Super Bowl title when the Rams defeated the Tennessee Titans in Super Bowl XXXIV.

At the 2002 NFC Championship game between the Tampa Bay Buccaneers and Philadelphia Eagles at Veterans Stadium, Montgomery was the Eagles’ honorary captain, and introduced to a thunderous ovation prior to the game.

He joined the Ravens in 2008 and was running backs coach through the 2013 season. He won his second Super Bowl title when the Ravens defeated the San Francisco 49ers in Super Bowl XLVII.

Montgomery was hired as running backs coach of the Cleveland Browns on February 6, 2014.  He was not retained after Head Coach Mike Pettine was fired.

Personal life
Montgomery is a native of Greenville, Mississippi, and one of four brothers (Fred, Cleotha Montgomery, and Tyrone) who played in the NFL.  Montgomery earned the Abilene Christian University Alumni Citation Award in 1979, was inducted onto the inaugural Philadelphia Eagles Honor Roll in 1987, and was inducted into the College Football Hall of Fame in 1996.

Montgomery and his wife Patti have three children, twins Briana and Brendan, and a son, Tavian. Montgomery also has a daughter, Sherrita, and a son Derron, who was a wide receiver for the Iowa State Cyclones and a Graduate Assistant and Assistant wide receiver coach for the Miami Hurricanes. Derron was a wide receiver coach for the Michigan Wolverines, tight ends coach for his father's alma mater Abilene Christian University and is now the Offensive Quality Control - Assistant RB’s coach for the Minnesota Vikings. Tavian is a current college sophomore, playing cornerback for Northern Arizona University.

References

External links
 Ravens coaching bio
 Wilbert Montgomery Then and Now 

1954 births
Living people
Sportspeople from Greenville, Mississippi
Abilene Christian University alumni
Abilene Christian Wildcats football players
American football running backs
American members of the Churches of Christ
Cleveland Browns coaches
College Football Hall of Fame inductees
Detroit Lions coaches
Detroit Lions players
National Conference Pro Bowl players
Sportspeople from Abilene, Texas
Philadelphia Eagles players
St. Louis Rams coaches
Baltimore Ravens coaches
Players of American football from Mississippi
Players of American football from Texas